Ishvara is a concept in Hinduism, with a wide range of meanings that depend on the era and the school of Hinduism. In ancient texts of Hindu philosophy, depending on the context, Ishvara can mean supreme Self, ruler, lord, king, queen or husband. In medieval era Hindu texts, depending on the school of Hinduism, Ishvara means God, Supreme Being, personal God, or special Self.

Ishvara is primarily an epithet of Shiva. In Shaivism, Ishvara is an epithet of Shiva. For many Vaishnavas, it is synonymous with Vishnu, like in his epithet of Venkateswara. In traditional Bhakti movements, Ishvara is one or more deities of an individual's preference (Iṣṭa-devatā) from Hinduism's polytheistic canon of deities. In modern-day sectarian movements such as Arya Samaj and Brahmoism, Ishvara takes the form of a monotheistic God. In the Yoga school of Hinduism, it is any "personal deity" or "spiritual inspiration".

Etymology
The root of the word Ishvara comes from īś- (ईश, Ish) meaning "capable of" and "owner, ruler, chief of". The second part of the word Ishvara is vara which means depending on context, "best, excellent, beautiful", "choice, wish, blessing, boon, gift", and "suitor, lover, one who solicits a girl in marriage". The composite word, Ishvara literally means "owner of best, beautiful", "ruler of choices, blessings, boons", or "chief of suitor, lover".

As a concept, Ishvara in ancient and medieval Sanskrit texts variously means God, Supreme Being, Supreme Self, Lord Shiva, a king or a ruler, a husband, the god of love, one of the Rudras and the number 'eleven'.

The word Īśvara does not appear in Rigveda. However, the verb īś- does appear in Rig veda, where the context suggests that the meaning of it is "capable of, able to". It is absent in Samaveda, is rare in Atharvaveda, but it appears in Samhitas of Yajurveda. The contextual meaning, however as the ancient Indian grammarian Pāṇini explains, is neither god nor supreme being.

The word Ishvara appears in numerous ancient Dharmasutras. However, Patrick Olivelle states that there Ishvara does not mean God, but means Vedas. Deshpande states that Ishvara in Dharmasutras could alternatively mean king, with the context literally asserting that the Dharmasutras are as important as Ishvara (the king) on matters of public importance".

The term is used as part of the compounds Maheshvara ("The Great Lord") and Parameshvara ("The Supreme Lord") as the names of Lord Shiva. In Mahayana Buddhism it is used as part of the compound "Avalokiteśvara" ("lord who hears the cries of the world", but see etymology section there), the name of a bodhisattva revered for his compassion. When referring to divine as female, particularly in Shaktism, the feminine  is sometimes used.

In Advaita Vedanta school, Ishvara is a monistic Universal Absolute that connects and is the Oneness in everyone and everything.

Schools of thought

Among the six systems of Hindu philosophy, Samkhya and Mimamsa do not consider the concept of Ishvara, i.e., a supreme being, relevant. Yoga, Vaisheshika, Vedanta and Nyaya schools of Hinduism discuss Ishvara, but assign different meanings.

Desmarais states that Isvara is a metaphysical concept in Yogasutras. It does not mention deity anywhere, nor does it mention any devotional practices (Bhakti), nor does it give Ishvara characteristics typically associated with a deity. In Yoga school of Hinduism, states Whicher, Isvara is neither a creator God nor the universal Absolute of Advaita Vedanta school of Hinduism. Whicher also notes that some theistic sub-schools of Vedanta philosophy of Hinduism, inspired by the Yoga school, explain the term Ishvara as the "Supreme Being that rules over the cosmos and the individuated beings". Malinar states that in Samkhya-Yoga schools of Hinduism, Isvara is neither a creator-God, nor a savior-God.

Zimmer in his 1951 Indian philosophies book noted that the Bhakti sub-schools refer to Isvara as a Divine Lord, or the deity of specific Bhakti sub-school. Modern sectarian movements have emphasized Ishvara as Supreme Lord; for example, Hare Krishna movement considers Krishna as the Lord,. In traditional theistic sub-schools of Hinduism, such as the Vishishtadvaita Vedanta of Ramanuja and Dvaita Vedanta of Madhva, Ishvara is identified as Lord Vishnu/Narayana, that is distinct from the prakriti (material world) and purusha (Self).

Radhakrishnan and Moore state that these variations in Ishvara concept is consistent with Hinduism's notion of "personal God" where the "ideals or manifestation of individual's highest Self values that are esteemed". Riepe, and others, state that schools of Hinduism leave the individual with freedom and choice of conceptualizing Ishvara in any meaningful manner he or she wishes, either in the form of "deity of one's choice" or "formless Brahman (Absolute Reality, Universal Principle, true special Self)".

In Samkhya

Samkhya is called one of the major atheistic schools of Hindu philososphy by some scholars. Others, such as Jacobsen, believe Samkhya is more accurately described as non-theistic. Yet others argue that Samkhya has been theistic from its very beginnings until medieval times. Isvara is considered an irrelevant concept, neither defined nor denied, in Samkhya school of Hindu philosophy.

In Yoga

The Yogasutras of Patanjali, the foundational text of Yoga school of Hinduism, uses the term Ishvara in 11 verses: I.23 through I.29, II.1, II.2, II.32 and II.45. Ever since the Sutra's release, Hindu scholars have debated and commented on who or what is Isvara? These commentaries range from defining Isvara from a "personal god" to "special self" to "anything that has spiritual significance to the individual". Whicher explains that while Patanjali's terse verses can be interpreted both as theistic or non-theistic, Patanjali's concept of Isvara in Yoga philosophy functions as a "transformative catalyst or guide for aiding the yogin on the path to spiritual emancipation".

Patanjali defines Isvara (Sanskrit: ईश्वर) in verse 24 of Book 1, as "a special Self (पुरुषविशेष, puruṣa-viśeṣa)",

Sanskrit: 
– Yoga Sutras I.24

This sutra of Yoga philosophy of Hinduism adds the characteristics of Isvara as that special Self which is unaffected (अपरामृष्ट, aparamrsta) by one's obstacles/hardships (क्लेश, klesha), one's circumstances created by past or one's current actions (कर्म, karma), one's life fruits (विपाक, vipâka), and one's psychological dispositions/intentions (आशय, ashaya).

Patanjali's concept of Isvara is neither a creator God nor the universal Absolute of Advaita Vedanta school of Hinduism.

In Vaisesika school of Hinduism
The Vaiśeṣika school of Hinduism, as founded by Kanada in the 1st millennium BC, neither required nor relied on Ishvara for its atomistic naturalism philosophy. To it, substances and paramāṇu (atoms) were eternal; they moved and interacted based on impersonal, eternal adrsta (अदृष्ट, invisible) laws of nature. The concept of Ishvara, among others, entered into Vaisheshika school many centuries later in the 1st millennium AD. This evolution in ideas aimed to explain how and why its so-called "atoms" have a particular order and proportions. These later-age ancient Vaiśeṣika scholars retained their belief that substances are eternal, and added Ishvara as another eternal who is also omniscient and omnipresent (not omnipotent). Ishvara did not create the world, according to this school of Hindu scholars, but He only created invisible laws that operate the world and then He becomes passive and lets those hidden universal laws do their thing. Thus, Vaisheshika's Ishvara mirrors Deus otiosus of Deism. Vaisheshika school's Ishvara, states Klaus Klostermaier, can be understood as an eternal God who co-exists in the universe with eternal substances and atoms, but He "winds up the clock, and lets it run its course".

In Nyaya

Early Nyaya school scholars considered the hypothesis of Ishvara as a creator God with the power to grant blessings, boons and fruits. However, the early Nyaya scholars rejected this hypothesis, though not the existence of God itself, and were non-theistic. Over time, the Nyaya school became one of the most important defenders of theism in Hindu philosophy.

In Nyayasutra's Book 4, Chapter 1 examines what causes production and destruction of entities (life, matter) in universe. It considers many hypotheses, including Ishvara. Verses 19–21, postulates Ishvara exists and is the cause, states a consequence of postulate, then presents contrary evidence, and from contradiction concludes that the postulate must be invalid.

Centuries later, the 5th century CE Nyaya school scholar Prastapada revisited the premise of Ishvara. He was followed by Udayana, who in his text Nyayakusumanjali, interpreted "it" in verse 4.1.21 of Nyaya Sutra above, as "human action" and "him" as "Ishvara", then he developed counter arguments to prove the existence of Ishvara. In developing his arguments, he inherently defined Ishvara as efficient cause, omnipotent, omniscient, infallible, giver of gifts, ability and meaning to humanity, divine creator of the world as well as the moral principles, and the unseen power that makes the karma doctrine work.

In Mimamsa

Mīmāṃsā scholars of Hinduism questioned what is Ishvara (God)? They used their pramana tools to cross-examine answers offered by other schools of Hinduism. For example, when Nyaya scholars stated God is omnipotent, omniscient and infallible, that the world is the result of God's creation which is proved by the presence of creatures, just like human work proves human existence, Mimamsa scholars asked, why does this God create the world, for what reason? Further, they added, it cannot be because of Ishvara's love to human beings because this world – if Ishvara created it – is imperfect and human Selfs are suffering in it. Mimamsa scholars of Hinduism raised numerous objections to any definition of Ishvara along with its premises, deconstructed justifications offered, and considered Ishvara concept unnecessary for a consistent philosophy and moksha (soteriology).

In Vedanta

Advaita Vedanta

The Advaita Vedanta school of Hinduism proclaims that at the empirical level Ishvara is the cause of the universe and the one who awards the fruits of every action. He is defined as the one without likes and dislikes, as well embodied with compassion (vaiṣamya Nairgghṛṇya doṣa vihīnaḥ).  Ishvara is that which is "free from avidyā (ignorance), free from ahaṃkṛti (ego-sense), free from bandhana (bondage)", a Self that is "pure, enlightened, liberated". 
Having accepted and established Ishvara, Advaita Vedanta proclaims that the real nature of Ishvara (existence, consciousness and bliss) is non different from the real nature of an individual. This gives room in Advaita Vedanta to show the nature of Ishvara as both the material and instrumental cause of this universe and the individual who is limited in his own capacities as unreal and declare that there is oneness between the two having negated the qualities. This establishes Ishvara as 'saguṇa' or with attributes from the empirical existence and 'nirguṇa' from the absolute sense.  This oneness is accepted only at the level of 'mukti' or ultimate realization and not at the 'vyavahara' or empirical level. At the absolute level there is no otherness nor distinction between Jiva (living being) and Ishvara, and any attempts to distinguish the two is a false idea, one based on wrong knowledge, according to Advaita Vedanta.

Other Advaitin Hindu texts resonate with the monist views of Adi Shankara. For example, Isa Upanishad, in hymn 1.5-7, states Ishvara is "above everything, outside everything, beyond everything, yet also within everything"; he who knows himself as all beings and all beings as himself – he never becomes alarmed before anyone. He becomes free from fears, from delusions, from root cause of evil. He becomes pure, invulnerable, unified, free from evil, true to truth, liberated like Ishvara.

Vishishtadvaita Vedanta

Ishvara, in Vishishtadvaita Vedanta sub-school of Hinduism, is a composite concept of dualism and non-dualism, or "non-dualism with differentiation". Ishvara, Vishishtadvaitin scholars such as the 11th century Ramanuja state, is the supreme creator and synonymous with Brahman. Equated with Vishnu in Vishishtadvaita or one of his avatar, he is both the material and efficient cause, transcendent and immanent. Ishvara manifests in five forms, believe Vishishtadvaitins: para (transcendent), vyuha (emanations), vibhava (incarnations), antaryamin (dwells inside), and arca (icons). According to this sub-school, states John Grimes, Ishvara possesses six divine qualities: jnana (knowledge), bala (strength), aisvarya (lordship), sakti (power), virya (virility) and tejas (splendor).

Ramanuja's Vishishtadvaita concepts provided the foundation for several Bhakti movements of Hinduism, such as those by Sri Aurobindo and has been suggested as having influenced Basava's Lingayatism.

Dvaita Vedanta

The Dvaita (dualism) sub-school of Vedanta Hinduism, founded by 13th century Madhva, defines Ishvara as creator God that is distinct from Jiva (individual Selfs in living beings). Narayana (Vishnu) is considered to be Ishvara, and the Vaishnavism movement arose on the foundation developed by Dvaita Vedanta sub-school.

Ishvara (God) is a complete, perfect and the highest reality to Dvaitins, and simultaneously the world is a separate reality for them, unlike competing thoughts in other sub-schools of Vedanta. In Dvaita sub-school, Jiva (individual Self) is different, yet dependent on Ishvara (God). Both possess the attributes of consciousness, bliss and existence, but the individual Self is considered atomic, while God is all encompassing. The attributes of Jiva struggle to manifest, while of God it is fully manifested.

Madhva states there are five permutations of differences between Jiva (individual Self) and Ishvara (God): between God and Self, between God and matter, between Self and matter, between one Self and another Self, and between one material thing and another material thing. The differences are both qualitative and quantitative. Unlike Advaita Vedantins who hold that knowledge can lead to Oneness with everyone and everything as well as fusion with the Universal Timeless Absolute, to the state of moksha in this life, Dvaita Vedantins hold that moksha is possible only in after-life if God so wills (if not, then one's Self is reborn). Further, Madhva highlights that God creates individual Self, but the individual Self never was and never will become one with God; the best it can do is to experience bliss by getting infinitely close to God.

The world, called Maya, is held as the divine will of Ishvara. Jiva suffers, experiences misery and bondage, state Dvaitins, because of "ignorance and incorrect knowledge" (ajnana). Liberation occurs with the correct knowledge and attainment unto Lord Narayana. It is His grace that gives salvation according to Dvaita sub-school, which is achievable by predominance of sattva guna (moral, constructive, simple, kindness-filled life), and therefore Dvaitins must live a dharmic life while constantly remembering, deeply loving Ishvara.

Achintya-Bheda-Abheda
 is a sub-school of Vedanta representing the philosophy of inconceivable one-ness and difference, in relation to the creation, Prakriti, and the creator, Ishvara (Krishna).

In Sanskrit achintya means 'inconceivable', bheda translates as 'difference', and abheda translates as 'one-ness'. Self (their English phrase for the Sanskrit word: jiva) are considered parts of God, and thus one with Him in quality, and yet at the same time different from Him in quantity. This is called acintya-bheda-abheda-tattva, inconceivable, simultaneous oneness and difference.

Caitanya's philosophy of acintya-bhedābheda-tattva completed the progression to devotional theism. Rāmānuja had agreed with  that the Absolute is one only, but he had disagreed by affirming individual variety within that oneness. Madhva had underscored the eternal duality of the Supreme and the Jīva: he had maintained that this duality endures even after liberation. Caitanya, in turn, specified that the Supreme and the jīvas are "inconceivably, simultaneously one and different" (acintya-bheda-abheda).

In Carvaka

Cārvāka, another atheist tradition in Hinduism, was materialist and a school of philosophical scepticism. They rejected all concepts of Ishvara as well as all forms of supernaturalism.

See also

 Absolute (philosophy)
 Bhagavan
 Conceptions of God
 Īśvarism
 Ishbara
 Maheśvara (Buddhism)
 Para Brahman
 Parameshashakti

References

Hindu philosophical concepts
Names of God in Hinduism
Superlatives in religion
Forms of Shiva